Winter into Spring is the third solo album of pianist George Winston, released in 1982. It was inspired by the transition of the seasons and was the follow-up to his 1980 album, Autumn. It was reissued on Winston's Dancing Cat label.  The album was certified Platinum by the RIAA on December 17, 1987.

Track listing

Charts

References

1982 albums
George Winston albums
Windham Hill Records albums
Dancing Cat Records albums